"Frans Hals" is a single by McCarthy released in March 1987; their last on Pink Label. The b-sides were "The Fall", "The Fall (remix)" and "Kill Kill Kill Kill" and "Frans Hals (version)".

The single is not on any of the band's three studio albums. It can be found on the releases A La Guillotine and That's All Very Well But....

Dutch Golden Age painter Frans Hals was the subject of the song and the lyrics were inspired by John Berger's comments on Hals in his 1972 book, Ways of Seeing.

Songs about painters
Cultural depictions of Dutch men
1987 singles
McCarthy (band) songs
Songs written by Malcolm Eden
1987 songs